László Köteles (born 1 September 1984) is a Hungarian former football goalkeeper.

Club career

Early career
Köteles played for Vác and Diósgyőr in the Hungarian NB I, and with FK Železnik, RFK Grafičar Beograd and FK Bežanija in Serbia and Montenegro.

Genk
In August 2009, Lázsló Köteles joined the Belgian KRC Genk on a one-year loan with an option to make the move permanent. The club has already had two other Hungarian players (Dániel Tőzsér and Balázs Tóth).

It was uncertain whether KRC Genk would continue with Köteles as the Hungarian has had some flaws in a few games, but in the play-offs of the Belgian league he got back to his regular level. In a small amount of time, Köteles has gained a lot of popularity with Genk fans due to his enthusiastic style of goalkeeping and the interaction with the fans, making them think of the legendary and unmatched popular goalkeeper István Brockhauser (also Hungarian) when the latter was first goalkeeper at KRC Genk, back in the 1990s.

On 23 August 2011, Köteles played an important role in qualifying for the group stages of the UEFA Champions League 2011–12 season. Genk beat Maccabi Haifa 4–1 on penalties. Köteles saved the penalties of Vladimir Dvalishvili and Eyal Golasa.

On 13 September 2011, Köteles debuted in the UEFA Champions League against Valencia. Köteles kept a clean sheet since the result was a goalless draw.

On 1 November 2011, Köteles saved the penalty shot by David Luiz and contributed to the second point gained in the UEFA Champions League 2011–12 season for Genk against Chelsea F.C. The final result was 1–1.

In January 2018, Genk and Köteles dissolved their agreement by mutual agreement.

Retirement
On 5 March 2018, he was signed by F.C. Copenhagen on a short-term contract.

International career
He was called up several times to be part of the Hungarian national team but never made a debut.

Honours
Genk
Belgian Pro League (1): 2010–11
Belgian Cup (1): 2012–13
Belgian Super Cup (1): 2011

References

External links
 
 
 
 
 
 Profile on hlsz.hu 
 Köteles László stats on BOON 
 
 Stats from Serbia at Srbijafudbal 

1984 births
Living people
Sportspeople from Csongrád-Csanád County
Hungarian footballers
Hungarian expatriate footballers
Association football goalkeepers
Fehérvár FC players
FK Železnik players
FK Bežanija players
Expatriate footballers in Serbia and Montenegro
Vác FC players
Diósgyőri VTK players
K.R.C. Genk players
F.C. Copenhagen players
Belgian Pro League players
Danish Superliga players
Expatriate footballers in Belgium
Expatriate men's footballers in Denmark